The France Pavilion is a French-themed pavilion that is part of the World Showcase within Epcot at Walt Disney World in Orlando, Florida. Its location is between the Morocco and United Kingdom pavilions.

Layout
The France Pavilion is themed to look like a Parisienne neighborhood with a pool and fountains and with a view of the Eiffel Tower in the distance. Most of the shops on the streets are actual shops selling French goods such as Guerlain perfume. The attraction effects France's cities and historical structures. It also includes two French restaurants, Monsieur Paul (formerly the Bistro de Paris) and Les Chefs de France; as well as the eateries Les Halles Boulangerie and Patisserie and L'artisan des Glace ice-cream parlour.

Attractions
As with many of the pavilions located within the World Showcase section of the Epcot park, a key aspect of the France Pavilion is its panoramic film Impressions de France. The film, which has been playing since the opening day of the Epcot park in 1982, offers a visual tour of the nation, set against a musical score written by Buddy Baker, encompassing the music of classical French composers such as Claude Debussy and Camille Saint-Saëns. The film itself is the work of director Rick Harper and produced by two-time Academy Award nominee Bob Rogers. The film's visual tour includes some of the nation's most stunning and romantic landmarks such as the cliffs of Étretat in the Haute-Normandie region, Mont Saint-Michel in Normandy, Château de Chambord in the Loire Valley, Notre Dame de Paris and the Eiffel Tower.

In addition to Impressions de France, which is set to became part of Palais du Cinéma, the France Pavilion is also one of the many themed land participants in the "Kim Possible World Showcase Adventure". This interactive scavenger hunt type attraction, which began in January 2009, was played across the numerous themed lands of Epcot's "World Showcase". It was replaced by "Agent P's World Showcase Adventure" in June 2012. On July 15, 2017, Disney announced that Remy's Ratatouille Adventure would be coming to the France Pavilion.

On January 16, 2020, a Beauty and the Beast sing-along show premiered in Palais du Cinéma, which alternates showtimes with Impressions de France. On December 12, 2022, EPCOT announced that a new interactive scavenger hunt game attraction called DuckTales World Showcase Adventure, which began in December 16, 2022, as part of Walt Disney World's 50th Anniversary celebration, since the opening date was postponed indefinitely following the closure of the park due to the COVID-19 pandemic.

Current Attractions
Palais du Cinéma
 Impressions de France (1982-Present)
 Beauty and the Beast Sing-Along (2020-Present)
 Remy's Ratatouille Adventure (2021-Present)
 DuckTales World Showcase Adventure (2022-Present)

Former Attractions
 Kim Possible World Showcase Adventure
 Agent P's World Showcase Adventure

Street performers and atmosphere
Belle, from the 1991 Disney animated film Beauty and the Beast, and Aurora, from the 1959 Disney animated film Sleeping Beauty, meet guests at the France Pavilion. In addition, the comedy chair climbing and balancing show "Serveur Amusant" performs on a daily basis outside Les Chefs de France. Also, adding to the themed land's atmosphere, are advertisements for Disneyland Paris and souvenirs featuring it.

Dining

Les Chefs de France was opened by French gastronomic legends Roger Vergé, Gaston Lenôtre, and Paul Bocuse. It opened at Epcot's inception in 1982 and has been run since 1996 by Bocuse's son Jérôme. In 2009, an animatronic Disney characterization of the rat Remy from the Disney animated feature Ratatouille appeared at the restaurant several times daily. The robotic rodent (which is the smallest the Imagineers at Disney have ever produced) was brought around by a handler to appear at diners' tables, which was especially apt given that one of the establishment's founders, Gaston Lenôtre, is widely believed to have been part of the inspiration for Auguste Gusteau in the film.
 Les Creperie de France
 Monsieur Paul
 Boulangerie Pâtisserie des Halles

References

External links

 Walt Disney World Resort - France Pavilion
 Walt Disney World Resort - Impressions de France
 Walt Disney World Resort - Bistro de Paris
 Walt Disney World Resort - Les Chefs de France
 Walt Disney World Resort - Serveur Amusant

Walt Disney Parks and Resorts attractions
Epcot
Eiffel Tower reproductions
World Showcase
Cultural history of France
Towers completed in 1982
1982 establishments in Florida